Yoania is a genus of flowering plants from the orchid family, Orchidaceae.

Distribution
This genus is mainly distributed in Japan, but Y. japonica is also found in Assam, China, and Taiwan and Y. prainii is found in the Himalayas and in northern Vietnam.

Species
Species recognized as of November 2020:

 Species formerly included:
Yoania aberrans Finet, 1900: synonym of Cymbidium macrorhizon Lindl., 1833
Yoania australis Hatch, 1963: synonym of Danhatchia australis (Hatch) Garay & Christenson, 1995

See also
List of Orchidaceae genera

References

External links

Calypsoinae
Calypsoinae genera
Orchids of Asia